Platanthera convallariifolia, the bog orchid, is a species of orchid native to the Aleutian Islands, far east Russia and northern Japan. It grows in wetlands such as fens and marshes.

References

External links 
 

convallariifolia
Flora of Russia
Flora of Japan